OM is a concept album by Negură Bunget, released on October 20, 2006, on the Code666 label. It was recorded in Negură Music Studio and produced, mixed and mastered by the band. A double LP of the album with a bonus track was released by Enucleation Records in 2008. Another double LP edition, remastered but without the bonus track, was released by Blood Music in 2014.

Critical reception

The album received wide critical acclaim from metal critics. Writing for AllMusic, Eduardo Rivadavia called OM the band's "opus" and cited its "breathtaking range and imagination", while Heathen Harvest's Conor Fynes said that the album "had one of the most original and otherworldly atmospheres ever committed to the black metal artform".

MetalStorm stated, "OM is nothing short of a masterpiece...A divine album with a unique style and its own trademark, this album is one of 2006's best efforts".

Sputnikmusic's Dean J. Brown gave OM a perfect 5 "classic" rating and retrospectively noted the album's major impact, saying, "Cinematic in its orchestration and flawless in its execution, Negură Bunget’s OM, at the time of its release, tore apart the confines of what constituted black metal and re-imagined it in line with the band's own morbid visions; which were entirely unique to their Romanian surroundings...It’s a masterpiece of art, not just music". He went on to list in the album among the black metal genre's most important records: "When the annals of black metal are finally written - [it] will sit at the pantheon alongside classics such as Darkthrone's Transilvanian Hunger, Mayhem's De Mysteriis Dom Sathanas and Emperor's In the Nightside Eclipse".

Track listing 
All songs written and arranged by Negură Bunget.

CD/2LP
 "Ceasuri rele" – 3:07 ("Dark Hours")
 "Țesarul de lumini" – 12:49 ("Weaver of Lights")
 "Primul OM" – 4:22 ("The First Human")
 "Cunoașterea tăcută" – 7:13 ("Silent Knowledge")
 "Înarborat" – 6:22 ("Rooted")
 "Dedesuptul" – 6:39 ("The Underneath")
 "Norilor" – 3:00 ("Of the Clouds")
 "De Piatră" – 5:36 ("Of Stone")
 "Cel din urmă vis" – 10:04 ("The Last Dream")
 "Hora soarelui" – 5:56 ("Sun's Circle Dance")
 "Al doilea OM" – 2:04 ("The Second Human")
 "Văzduh" – 5:58 ("Air") [bonus track on Enucleation Records vinyl only]

DVD (limited edition)
 "Cunoașterea tăcută" – clip – (filmed in Retezat, Bucegi and Făgăraş Mountains)
 "Norilor" – clip
 "Primul om" – slideshow
 "III" – live clip (filmed in Barossel)
 "Văzduh" – clip (remixed/remastered) - (filmed in Apuseni Mountains)
 "Bruiestru" – live in Studio Rock, Bucharest, May 2003
 "IIII" – live in Zella-Mehlis, Shadow from the East Tour, April 2004
 "Wordless Knowledge" – live in Munich, OM Tour, November 2005
 "Negura Bunget" – interview, February 2006

Personnel
 Hupogrammos Disciple – vocals, guitars, bass guitar, keyboards, synthesizers, nai, flute, tulnic 
 Sol Faur – guitars, keyboards
 Drimus – pan pipes
 Ermit – bass guitar
 Negru – drums, percussion, xylophone, toacă

Production
Executive producer: Code666 
Produced, engineered, mixed and mastered by Negură Bunget at Negură Music Studio
Dan Florin Spataru (Encoilmark) – artwork, art direction, design, cover design, photography

References

External links
 Review for OM on BestBlackMetalAlbums.com

Negură Bunget albums
2006 albums
Concept albums